is a railway station located in the city of  Kakamigahara,  Gifu Prefecture,  Japan, operated by the private railway operator Meitetsu.

Lines

Station layout
Meiden Kakamigahara  Station has two ground-level opposed side platforms connected by a level crossing. The station is unattended.

Platforms

Adjacent stations

History
It was renamed  on December 1, 1938. From October 1, 1965, the station has used the present transliteration of its name.

Surrounding area
Kagamigahara Station (JR Central Takayama Main Line)

See also
 List of Railway Stations in Japan

External links

  

Railway stations in Japan opened in 1926
Stations of Nagoya Railroad
Railway stations in Gifu Prefecture
Kakamigahara, Gifu